Prazitone (AGN-511) is a barbiturate derivative developed in the 1970s. Unlike most barbiturates, it has little or no sedative effects, instead acting as a non-sedating anxiolytic and antidepressant. The dosage range in humans is around 200–600 mg, although higher doses have been used in trials for the treatment of depression associated with Parkinson's disease.

References 

Antidepressants
Anxiolytics
Barbiturates
Piperidines
Pyrimidines